Ray Davies ( 3 October 1931, Wallasey - March 2019) was a footballer who played as a winger for Tranmere Rovers. Davies spent his entire playing career at the club, making 120 Football League appearances over seven seasons.

References

1931 births
2019 deaths
People from Wallasey
Association football wingers
English footballers
Tranmere Rovers F.C. players
English Football League players